Octenylsuccinic acid is a manufactured ingredient in foods. It is used to treat gum arabic, and also in waxy maize production and for rice starch production.

See also
 Octenyl succinic acid modified gum arabic

References

food additives
Dicarboxylic acids